Lee Soo-min is a Korean name consisting of the family name Lee and the given name Soo-min, and may also refer to:

 Lee Soo-min (golfer) (born 1993), South Korean golfer
 Lee Soo-min (actress, born 1984) (born 1984), South Korean actress
 Lee Soo-min (actress, born 2001) (born 2001), South Korean actress